Susan Smith (born 1971) is an American woman sentenced to life in prison for murdering her children.

Susan Smith may also refer to:

Susan Smith (model) (born 1959), American model (Playboy Playmate) and actress
Susan Arnout Smith (born 1948), novelist, television scriptwriter, playwright and essayist
Susan J. Smith, British geographer and Mistress of Girton College, Cambridge
Susan Kennedy or Susan Smith, a character in Neighbours
Susan L. Smith, art historian
Susan Smith, namesake of the Susan Smith Blackburn Prize for English-language women playwrights
Sue Smith (footballer) (born 1979), English footballer
Susan Smith (rower) (born 1965), British Olympic rower
Susan Smith (swimmer) (born 1950), Canadian swimmer
Sue Smith (politician) (born 1951), politician in Tasmania, Australia
Susan Bitter Smith (born 1956), politician in Arizona, USA
Susan Smith-Walsh (born 1971), Irish hurdler

See also
Sue Smith (disambiguation)